Chakkol may refer to:
 Chakkol, Hirmand
 Chakkol, Khash
 Chakkol, Saravan